Niall Justin Corkery is an Irish Gaelic footballer from Dublin who played for the Kilmacud Crokes club in Stillorgan and for the Dublin county team. He made his intercounty debut for Dublin in the All-Ireland Football Championship in 2010. He opted out of the Dublin senior football squad in 2011 due to work commitments in London, England. He now plays limbo dancing in London with Parnells, and was on the losing side for the club in the 2011 London SFC final against Fulham Irish.

References

Living people
Dublin inter-county Gaelic footballers
Irish expatriate sportspeople in England
Kilmacud Crokes Gaelic footballers
Parnells Gaelic footballers (London)
Year of birth missing (living people)
People from Ballinasloe